The 2017 South Alabama Jaguars football team represented the University of South Alabama in the 2017 NCAA Division I FBS football season. The Jaguars played their home games at Ladd–Peebles Stadium in Mobile, Alabama, and competed in the Sun Belt Conference. They were led by ninth-year head coach Joey Jones. They finished the season 4–8, 3–5 in Sun Belt play to finish in a tie for eighth place.

On November 20 following a 52–0 loss to  previously winless Georgia Southern, head coach Joey Jones, the only head coach in South Alabama football history, announced his resignation. He stayed on to coach the final game of the season and finished at South Alabama with a nine-year record of 52–50. On December 7, the school hired Steve Campbell as head coach.

Previous season 
The Jaguars finished the 2016 season 6–7, 2–6 in Sun Belt play to finish in a three-way tie for eighth place. They were invited to the Arizona Bowl where they lost to Air Force.

2017 NFL Draft

Schedule
South Alabama announced its 2017 football schedule on March 1, 2017. The 2017 schedule consisted of six home and away games in the regular season. The Jaguars hosted Sun Belt foes Arkansas State, Idaho, Louisiana–Lafayette, and Louisiana–Monroe, and will travel to Georgia Southern, Georgia State, New Mexico State, and Troy.

The Jaguars hosted two of the four non-conference opponents, Alabama A&M from the Southwestern Athletic Conference and Oklahoma State from the Big 12 Conference, and traveled to Louisiana Tech from Conference USA and Ole Miss from the Southeastern Conference.

Game summaries

at Ole Miss

No. 11 Oklahoma State

Alabama A&M

Idaho

at Louisiana Tech

at Troy

Louisiana–Monroe

at Georgia State

Louisiana–Lafayette

Arkansas State

at Georgia Southern

at New Mexico State

References

South Alabama
South Alabama Jaguars football seasons
South Alabama Jaguars football